Warren A. Sherman Elementary School is a public elementary school in Warwick, Rhode Island.This school is a Feinstein Leadership School. The school's principal is Charlee McElroy, and secretary is Kathryn Wickham. Sherman educates students grade K-5.

Mission statement
The mission of Sherman School in partnership along with community staff and the students' parents to increase Sherman students' skills and education necessary to create enduring learners who will be productive, responsible citizens in a culturally diverse institute. The Sherman students will be respectful, responsible, and ready to learn each and every day.

History
Warren A. Sherman school is an elementary school  grades K-5.  Sherman School was built in 1953 and opened in September 1954.  It was named after Warren A. Sherman, who was the first Superintendent of Warwick Schools from 1930-1949.  Every year, members of his family attended the ceremonial dedication on Tuesday, November 16, 1954. When Sherman School was scheduled to open in 1954, it was announced that there would not be enough space for all of the neighborhood children to attend.  Other buildings in the community would be used as schools for the excess students.  Sherman School opened with an average of 35 students per class. Now there is currently mainly 23 students per class. Currently, there is about 310 students participating as students.

Other Activities
 Mad Science Club
 Lego Club
 Fuel Up Play 60
 Yearbook Club
 ALAP (temporarily gone from staff list)

PTO
Also known as, "'Parent-Teacher Organization; are everywhere and almost in every elementary, or primary school. They work with students' parents to resolve problems for students and raise money for field trips.

They also hold fundraisers and to help other people in the world.

Fundraising
The PTO does many fundraising to help the world. Warren A. Sherman Elementary School is a Feinstein Leadership School.

Here are just a few fundraisers each year:
 Color Run 
Penny War is only for fifth grade, which they bring in several pennies and fill up a jar to fund their end of year.
 Trunk or Treat

Sources
www.warwickschools.org/sherman/default.htm
www.schnet.ncpe.uri.edu/data/800/25361/08/sf-a-wp-10.PDF

External links
 www.warwickschools.org
  http://www.feinsteinfoundation.org/
 www.alap.edu.com
 www.school.fueluptoplay.com/community/print-story.php?id=38642176
 www.greatschools.org/rhode-island/warwick/285
  http://www.heart.org/HEARTORG/Giving/ForIndividuals/JoinanEvent/jump-rope-sub-home_UCM_315609_SubHomePage.jsp
  https://secure3.convio.net/jdrf3/site/SPageServer/;jsessionid=73AE8FD4F59A1B7486405CAEA7BC99DF.app333b?pagename=walk_event_list&pcrid=25926772430&ts=1344993529293&state=RI&mkwid=sIms59kBU

Elementary schools in Rhode Island
Buildings and structures in Warwick, Rhode Island
1953 establishments in Rhode Island
Educational institutions established in 1953